Jibanananda Prize, also known as Jibanananda Puroshkar, is a literary award instituted in Bangladesh in the memory of the Indian Bengali poet Jibanananda Das. The prize is given away every year to the best works of poetry and prose by Bangladeshi authors.

Background
The award was first initiated in 2007 by the Bangladeshi literary organisations  "Sahitya Soikat" of Jhalakathi, "Dhanasiri" of Barisal and "Durba" magazine of Gopalganj. The awards are being given every year to a poet and a prose writer for original literary works produced in Bengali language in Bangladesh.

List of prize winners
 2019 :- Jewel Mazhar for poetry; Abdul Mannan Sarker for prose
 2014 :- Khaled Hossain for poetry; Imtiar Shamim for prose
 2013 :- Khonadakar Ashraf Hossain for poetry; Shantanu Kaisar for prose
 2006 :- Shamsur Rahman

References

Bangladeshi literary awards
Awards established in 2007
Bengali-language literature